Not My Responsibility is a 2020 American short film written and produced by singer-songwriter Billie Eilish. A spoken-word piece, it stars Eilish and depicts her in a dark room, where she delivers a monologue about the double standards and body shaming she has received as a public figure. It premiered during the Where Do We Go? World Tour in March 9, 2020, as a concert interlude, and was released online on May 26, 2020.

The film received positive reviews from critics, who praised the commentary and tone, which they perceived as empowering. Its audio was later included in Eilish's second studio album, Happier Than Ever (2021). Some music journalists labeled it as the album's centerpiece, while others questioned its appearance in the tracklist, feeling like it lost its emotional impact without the visuals.

Background and release

American singer-songwriter Billie Eilish released her debut studio album, When We All Fall Asleep, Where Do We Go?, in March 2019, to commercial success; the album assisted her rise to widespread recognition. Her fashion style at the time, specifically her choice to wear baggy clothing, caught the public's attention and scrutiny. She had been wearing such clothes to avoid sexual objectification, being extremely conscious about her body as a teenager who had struggled with her self-image since 11 years old. Many people saw her as undesirable and unfeminine because of what she wore.

Upon turning 18 years old, Eilish began wearing less oversized clothes. She continued to receive negative comments about her appearance, getting slut-shamed or called a "fat cow". Eilish, who had been using her platform to spread a message of body positivity, wrote and produced the short film Not My Responsibility as a response against body shaming and the double standards placed upon young women's appearances. A spoken-word piece, it premiered during the Miami date of her Where Do We Go? World Tour on March 9, 2020, as a concert interlude. The film was uploaded onto Eilish's YouTube channel on May 26, 2020.

Synopsis

Not My Responsibility is set in a dimly lit room, and it begins with Eilish in a black jacket. As electronic music plays in the background, she gradually undresses until she is in nothing but a necklace and a black sleeveless shirt. She takes off the shirt and reveals a black bra underneath. Slowly, Eilish submerges herself in a pool of black water and resurfaces, fully covered in the substance.

The film features commentary from Eilish while she undresses. She comments on the public discussion around her physical appearance and acknowledges the varying opinions people hold of her, but she questions whether they "really know" her enough to make assumptions about her body. She criticizes the way in which they decide her worth based on the assumptions in question. Eilish addresses the double standards she faces for wearing anything she likes: "If I wear what is comfortable, I am not a woman. If I shed the layers, I'm a slut." Then, she concludes with the lines, "Is my value based only on your perception? Or is your opinion of me not my responsibility?"

Critical reception
Not My Responsibility received praise from critics. Lars Brandle wrote for Billboard that Eilish got to demonstrate her "creative juices" with the film, and he commented positively on the background music. Other music journalists, including Althea Legaspi of Rolling Stone, Ruth Kinane of Entertainment Weekly, and Dorany Pineda of Los Angeles Times, lauded Not My Responsibility for its message, which they found to be empowering. Riley Runnells, a Paper author, conveyed her admiration for the film's thesis—"Is my value based only on your perception? Or is your opinion of me not my responsibility?"—due to its vulnerable and melancholic tone. Carolyn Twersky of Seventeen praised Eilish for criticizing sexist standards in an "intense" manner, concluding the article with the line "Preach Billie!!!!" Teen Vogue Laura Pitcher expressed pity for Eilish's longstanding experience with body shaming, but felt inspired by her continuing drive to speak out against unfair standards towards women's appearance. Kara Nesvig, for the same publication, said: "One of the things we love most about [her] is that she isn't afraid of sharing what's on her mind." Analyzing the film, Uproxx music editor Derrick Rossignol argued that Not My Responsibility marked Eilish's "biggest statement" about body shaming in her career to date.

As a song 

The short film's audio was included as the ninth track on Eilish's second studio album, Happier Than Ever. The album was released on July 30, 2021, through Darkroom and Interscope Records. Its lyrical themes discuss the struggles that young women face in the entertainment industry: emotional abuse, power imbalance, and misogyny.

An ambient, electropop track that uses synthesizers, "Not My Responsibility" was written in part by Eilish; her older brother, Finneas O'Connell, receives co-writing and production credits. In an album commentary for Spotify, she described the song's lyrics as "some of my favorite words that I've ever written [yet] I feel like nobody listened [to the message]". Its instrumental was sampled to create the beat for the following album track, "Overheated", which allowed for a musical transition between the two.

Eilish performed "Not My Responsibility" as part of the Disney+ concert film Happier Than Ever: A Love Letter to Los Angeles, released on September 3, 2021. She also included it in the set list of a 2022–2023 world tour in support of Happier Than Ever.

Critical reception 
Some critics considered "Not My Responsibility" to be Happier Than Ever centerpiece. According to them, the song exemplified the album's crucial motifs: the intense media gossip around Eilish as a young woman, as well as her reflection on its negative effects. Carl Wilson, analyzing Happier Than Ever for Slate, wrote that amidst all speculation about her personal life, "the focus on her body has clearly hit Eilish hardest." Pitchfork Quinn Moreland thought that the song "sets the tone" for the second half of the album, which deals with topics such as power dynamics, voyeurism, and sexuality.

In a review of Happier Than Ever for The A.V. Club, Alex McLevy observed that "Not My Responsibility" felt more like a TED talk than a song that contained any artistry. Insider Callie Ahgrim, while appreciating its commentary, felt like it could have been excluded from the album's tracklist. She believed that it lost its impact without the visuals from the short film—a sentiment that Moreland and McLevy echoed. Courteney Larocca, as a reply to Ahgrim, added: "slapping it haphazardly onto an official tracklist only evokes an eye-roll and a guarantee of pressing skip." Other critics shared similar opinions, calling its lyrics pretentious or excessive in the context of the album. On a more positive note, NME Sophie Williams regarded "Not My Responsibility" as one of Eilish's "most powerful and haunting songs" in her discography.

Credits and personnel 

Credits are adapted from the liner notes of Happier Than Ever.

 Billie Eilish – vocals, vocal engineering, songwriting
 Finneas O'Connell – songwriting, production, engineering, vocal arranging, bass, drum programming, synthesizer
 Dave Kutch – mastering
 Rob Kinelski – mixing

Charts

References

External links
 

2020 short films
American short films
Billie Eilish
Body image in popular culture
2020s English-language films
2021 songs
Billie Eilish songs
Songs written by Billie Eilish
Songs written by Finneas O'Connell
Song recordings produced by Finneas O'Connell